Émilie Favre (born 8 December 1992) is a French ski mountaineer.

Selected results 
 2011:
 2nd, World Championship, relay, together with Laëtitia Roux and Sandrine Favre
 8th, Pierra Menta, together with Sandrine Favre
 2012:
 4th, European Championship relay, together with Laëtitia Roux and Corinne Favre
 7th, European Championship, sprint

External links 
 Emilie Favre at skimountaineering.org

References 

1992 births
Living people
French female ski mountaineers
21st-century French women